Callimormus is a genus of skippers in the family Hesperiidae.

Species
The following species are recognised in the genus Callimormus:
 Callimormus alsimo
 Callimormus corades
 Callimormus corus
 Callimormus interpunctata
 Callimormus juventus
 Callimormus radiola
 Callimormus rivera
 Callimormus saturnus
 Callimormus simplicius

References

External links 
 

 
 Callimormus at tolweb.org
 Natural History Museum Lepidoptera genus database

Hesperiinae
Hesperiidae genera